Nahal Hemar Cave is an archeological cave site in Israel, on a cliff in the Judean Desert near the Dead Sea and just northwest of Mount Sodom.

The excavations here are considered to be one of the most conspicuous Pre-Pottery Neolithic assemblages ever found in the Levant. The find consisted of wooden artifacts, fragments of baskets and plaster assemblages. The objects found in the cave included rope baskets, fabrics, nets, wooden arrowheads, bone and flint utensils including a sickle and weaving spatulae, and decorated human skulls. There were also ceremonial masks similar to other neolithic masks found inside a 30-mile radius of the Judean Desert and Judean Hills and unusual so-called "Nahal Hemar knives."

The trove was found covered in what was thought to be asphalt from nearby construction projects. Closer analyses revealed it was in fact an ancient glue that dated to around 8310–8110 years ago. It was collagen-based, possibly deriving from animal skins and may have served to waterproof the objects or as an adhesive. Similar glue was previously identified in Egypt, but that found in Nahal Hemar was twice as old.

Plaster assemblages
This group of beads, basketry, and statue fragments is believed to have been used for ritual purposes. This lime plaster was one of the first intentionally made chemical alterations where the makers had complete control over the properties. The presence of the plaster has been deemed of great importance because of the efforts applied to the process of making and applying the plaster.

The beads found in this assemblage may have been used on garments designed for specific events.

The method of examining the plaster assemblages

The examination of the Nahal Hemar artifacts included:

1. All the plaster statue fragments and plaster beads were examined under a Wild M-8 stereoscopic microscope under oblique illumination to roughly define the homogeneity of the samples.

2. Tiny lumps of plaster were removed from the items on several locations using a diamonds saw, spatulas, and fine drills bits. Chips with the film casting pigments were sampled in several cases for chemical analyses of straining materials. They used broken artifacts in most cases to prevent further damage to the remaining artifacts.

3. Bulk samples were subjected to Thin-Section Petrographic Analysis (TSPA).

4. Mineralogical analyses of the non-calcareous components were carried out to more samples, in which the admixture of clay was observed by the TSPA analysis. The samples were powdered and soaked in 3% HCl to remove the carbonate ingredients and the clay mineralogy was determined by X-Ray Diffraction (XRD).

5. Chemical analyses were done on most samples using Inductively Coupled Plasma Atomic Emission Spectrometry (ICP-AES). The benefit of this method is that it has high accuracy with low limits of detection.

6. Small lumps that were coated with yellow, green, red, or dark pigments were removed from the plaster statue and beads and used for X-Ray Fluorescence (XRF) analysis, which provided a chemical definition of the pigment materials.

The results of the study:

Beads: All but one bead was produced from a mixture of burnt lime and calcite crystals. The one bead without this mixture had anhydrite crystal also appear within the burnt lime (this was indicated by both TSPA and ICP-AES analyses). The most important trait is that all the beads are dense contents of calcite crystals. It can be concluded that the beads were likely all made in the same place and for the same reason and all had the same use. All of the beads were made by the same technique, which can be seen in their mineralogy and chemistry. Because the beads were all so closely related, it seems likely that they were all made for the same purpose. It is assumed that the beads were used as parts of garments or costumes for a specific event.

Statues: The statues have opposite homogeneity as compared to the beads and baskets. The statues vary greatly in their technology and compositions. The statues can be broken up into seemingly four different categories of statues based on their composition. This hints to the fact they were likely built in different locations possibly by the Mediterranean shore and were brought to Nahal Hemar in their present state. There was more than likely little done to the statues once they got into Nehal Hemar. It is thought that the statues were used for ceremonies or ritual activities and the different statues had different symbols.

Magical site
Nahal Hemar with its small size is proposed to be a place for religious ceremonies or magic that was part of an ancestor cult as indicated by the decorated skulls and carved limestone masks. Celebrants may have worn the masks to honor the dead. Other artifacts at the site such as the partial garments and animal and anthropoid figurines have bolstered the notion of it principally serving magical purposes. Additionally, the statue fragments may have been brought from distant locations as a donation that was part of the rituals.

See also
Dead Sea Scrolls
Citrullus colocynthis
Göbekli Tepe

References

External links
 WorldCat retrieved 20:04 14.10.11

Archaeological sites in Israel
Caves of Israel
Judaean Desert
Pre-Pottery Neolithic
Neolithic sites of Asia